Picein is a phenolic compound found in mycorrhizal roots of Norway spruces (Picea abies). It is the glucoside of piceol.

See also
Pungenin

References 

Phenol glucosides
Aromatic ketones